Carnon Mine was a tin mine at Restronguet Creek, near the village of Devoran in Cornwall, England. A ruined engine house survives on the north bank of the creek. It is a Grade II listed building.

History
The tin mine opened in 1824. The surviving engine house is thought to have housed an engine of cylinder diameter 24 inches. An artificial island was created in the estuary; shafts, in the form of cast iron cylinders made at Perran Foundry, were sunk there, and a 14-inch engine and horse whim erected. Water was pumped from the mine by the engine on the estuary bank via flatrods.

The mine was profitable, but closed in 1830; the Redruth and Chasewater Railway complained that boats using the creek were obstructed.

Description
The south-east wall and parts of the north-east and south-west walls of the engine house survive, to a height of two storeys of the original three storeys. The south-west wall, the "bob wall" that supported the beam of the beam engine, is thicker than the others.

See also

 Mining in Cornwall and Devon

References

Tin mines in Cornwall
Grade II listed buildings in Cornwall